Tradate is a city and comune located in the province of Varese, in the Lombardy region of northern Italy. It received the honorary title of city with a presidential decree on January 28, 1958.

The mayor is Giuseppe Bascialla.

The city hosts the Fisogni Museum of the Petrol Stations, awarded by Guinness World Records for the biggest collection in the world of fuel pumps, and the Frera Motorcycle Museum.

The origin of the name
The name "Tradate" has uncertain origins. There are two different interpretations about its creation:
The historian Gerhard Rohlfs thought that the name came from the first name Theodorus
Antonio Olivieri, instead, thought that the denomination came from the Germanic name Teuderad, that transformed afterwards into Tederate.

History 
In Roman times, the Mediolanum-Bilitio road passed through Tradate's territory. This road connected Mediolanum (Milan) and Luganum (Lugano), passing through Varisium (Varese). 
This territory, was thought to be inhabited since the Romans, and continued to be during the barbarian migrations, that brought to the fall of the Roman Empire.

Main sights
 Castello Pusterla Melzi
 Villa Sopranzi, which hosts Pavoniani's institute.
 St. Stephen Church
 St. Peter and Paul Church (Abbiate Guazzone)
 St. Maria in Castello Church (built in 14th century)
 Fisogni Museum of the Petrol Station
 Frera Motorcycle Museum

References

External links
Comune di Tradate Online

Cities and towns in Lombardy